The R322 is a Regional Route in South Africa. Its northern origin is a t-junction with the R324 between Suurbraak and Barrydale. The northern and western routes are signed the R324, with R322 heading just south of east. It reaches Heidelberg where it meets the N2. It becomes co-signed with this route, heading just south of west. After a short distance, it diverges from the N2 and heads south-south-west. The route ends at Port Beaufort (near Witsand) where it rejoins the R324.

External links
 Routes Travel Info

References

Regional Routes in the Western Cape